Gary Merchant is a New Hampshire politician.

Political career
On November 6, 2018, Merchant was elected to the New Hampshire House of Representatives where he represents the Sullivan 4 district. Merchant assumed office on December 5, 2018. Merchant is a Democrat.

Personal life
Merchant resides in Claremont, New Hampshire.

References

Living people
People from Claremont, New Hampshire
University of New Hampshire alumni
Northeastern University alumni
Democratic Party members of the New Hampshire House of Representatives
21st-century American politicians
Year of birth missing (living people)